{{DISPLAYTITLE:C6H8N2O2}}
The molecular formula C6H8N2O2 (molar mass: 140.14 g/mol, exact mass: 140.0586 u) may refer to:

 Dimiracetam
 Gaboxadol, also known as 4,5,6,7-tetrahydroisoxazolo(5,4-c)pyridin-3-ol (THIP)